Kevin R. McMahon (born October 12, 1962 in Grand Rapids, Michigan) is an American conductor, composer, orchestrator, clinician and violinist.

McMahon attended the University of Michigan, where his primary teachers were Jacob Krachmalnick and Gustav Meier.

McMahon was awarded the Collins Wisconsin Distinguished Fellowship, earning a Doctor of Musical Arts in Conducting from the University of Wisconsin-Madison. His primary teachers were David E. Becker, James Smith, Charles Dill, Stephen Dembski and William Farlow.

Former conducting positions include music director/conductor of the Symphony School of America Chamber Orchestra (1985–1986), music director/conductor of the National Arts Chamber Orchestra(1985–1988), music director/conductor Classical Symphony Chamber Ensemble (1988–1989), music director/conductor Lincoln Opera of Chicago (1989–1994), cover conductor for the South Bend Symphony (1992–1995), music director/conductor of the Northwest Indiana Youth Orchestra (1989–2000), and music director and conductor of the Illinois Valley Symphony Orchestra (1995–2008). He served as music director/conductor for the Wheaton Symphony and Pops Orchestra from 2009 to 2017. McMahon served as artistic director/conductor/violin recitalist for the Maud Powell Music Festival from 1999 to 2018. In October 2009, McMahon guest conducted for the Sheboygan Symphony Orchestra for the first time, and on success of that appearance, in 2010 was named the orchestra's music director/conductor serving from 2010 to 2020. He served as associate conductor for the New York (City) Repertory Orchestra from 2005 to 2021.

Academic appointments, including graduate school, include the University of Michigan, Kalamazoo College, Illinois Valley Community College, Northern Illinois University, University of Wisconsin-Madison, Ripon College (Wisconsin) and Purdue University Fort Wayne.

In the United States McMahon has guest conducted, or led orchestras, opera and ballet companies on tour, in Chicago, Spokane, Elgin, Evanston, Tampa, South Bend, Cleveland, Indianapolis, Atlanta, Madison, Los Angeles, Ann Arbor, Milwaukee, and Washington, D.C.

In Europe McMahon served as resident conductor for the Rome Festival Opera, Orchestra, and Ballet (1995–2004). He conducted orchestras, operas, and ballet companies in Italy, Bulgaria, Greece, Romania, the Czech Republic, and Germany.

Among McMahon's notable compositional achievements are the world premiere performances of his theater works Marilyn Monroe (2004) and librettist for Maud Powell-Queen of Violinists (2006). In March 2000 the Illinois Valley Symphony Orchestra premiered a symphony that was written by McMahon titled "Valley of the Illinois", for the orchestra's 50th Anniversary season.

In 2002, McMahon was recognized for Meritorious Service in Orchestra Conducting by the Illinois Council of Orchestras. The presentation of the award took place at the Union League Club of Chicago and was followed by a reception in honor of Maestro McMahon and other award recipients. The event was sponsored by the Chicago Fine Arts Society.

References

External links
 Purdue University Fort Wayne Orchestra
 Kevin McMahon's official website

American male composers
21st-century American composers
Living people
Musicians from Grand Rapids, Michigan
1962 births
University of Michigan School of Music, Theatre & Dance alumni
21st-century American male musicians